Ourouer-les-Bourdelins is a commune in the Cher department in the Centre-Val de Loire region of France.

Geography
The river Airain forms all of the commune's northwestern boundary.

Population

Sights
 The church of St. Christophe, dating from the twelfth century.
 The fifteenth-century chateau.

See also
Communes of the Cher department

References

External links

Annuaire Mairie website 

Communes of Cher (department)